Erythranthe palmeri is a species of monkeyflower known by the common name Palmer's monkeyflower. It was formerly known as Mimulus palmeri.

It is native to California and northern Baja California, where it grows in sandy, often disturbed soils from the southern Sierra Nevada foothills and the Mojave Desert to the Peninsular Ranges.

Description
Erythranthe palmeri is a hairy annual herb growing up to about 28 centimeters in maximum height with a thin, spindly stem. The oppositely arranged linear to oval leaves are under 3 centimeters long.

The tubular base of the flower is encapsulated in a ribbed calyx of sepals with pointed lobes. The flower has a narrow throat and wide five-lobed face. It is one or two centimeters long and usually deep pinkish purple with variable yellow and purple markings in the mouth.

References

External links
Jepson Manual Treatment
Calflora Database: Mimulus palmeri (Palmer's monkeyflower)
USDA Plants Profile
Photo gallery

palmeri
Flora of California
Flora of Baja California
Flora of the California desert regions
Flora of the Sierra Nevada (United States)
Natural history of the California chaparral and woodlands
Natural history of the Mojave Desert
Natural history of the Peninsular Ranges
Natural history of the Transverse Ranges
Flora without expected TNC conservation status